Dubai International Academic City (DIAC), informally known as Academic City, is a university town in the city of Dubai, United Arab Emirates along the Dubai-Al Ain Road. The project was launched in May 2006 in liaison with Dubai Knowledge Park. The regulatory authority in the DIAC is the Dubai Development Authority.

As a university town, DIAC is a foundation for schools, colleges and universities. Consisting of 27 colleges and universities, 3 innovation centers, the DIAC enrolls about 27,500 students. It offers more than 500 academic programs in different fields.

History
DIAC was established in 2007 as a university town and a residential free-zone dedicated to higher education by TECOM Group. It was approved by Government of Dubai and was launched as a common campus where schools, colleges and universities from Knowledge Park would move to. Dr. Ayoub Kazim, former associate professor of United Arab Emirates University served as Managing Director of DIAC. In 2016, Mohammad Abdullah, president of Dubai Institute of Design and Innovation became the managing director.

With a campus area of more than 129 million square feet, DIAC acts as a foundation for several residential colleges and universities. After its inception, a campus expansion program was taken up, which finished in 2012. In 2006, Institute of Management Technology, Dubai was one of the first universities to set up permanent campus in DIAC.

The year of 2017 witnessed 10 year anniversary of Dubai International Academic City. In the same year, Curtin University, United Arab Emirates University branch campuses were announced to establish in DIAC.

Present form
DIAC has grown into a educational hub. Consisting of 27 residential colleges and universities and 3 innovation centers, DIAC enrolls more than 27,500 students of over 150 nationalities. Universities and colleges offer more than 500 bachelor, master and doctoral programs in various fields of business, engineering, general sciences, humanities, management, medical sciences and technology. It was titled as MENA's largest educational hub. Many other institutions are expected to move to DIAC in future. Currently, DIAC comprises reputed and renowned universities from other countries like American University, Murdoch University, BITS Pilani, British University.

Due to large number of student intake, DIAC has taken up student housing projects for providing budget friendly accommodation to students enrolled in colleges affiliated to DIAC, As of now 2 of these student housing projects have been completed and are fully operational. However, some universities provide their own residential facilities and students are allowed to opt any of the two.

DIAC has taken several steps to promote innovation and startups and provides incubation, facilities to interested students in innovation centers.

Institutions

Colleges
 Dubai English Speaking College
 Dubai Men's College
 Hamdan eTQM University
 Higher Colleges of Technology
 Imam Malik College
 UK College of Business and Computing - Dubai Campus

Research centers
 Dubai Statistics Center
 International Center for Biosaline Agriculture (ICBA)

Schools
 German School Dubai
 Lycée Français International Georges Pompidou
 Sheikh Rashid bin Saeed Islamic Institute

Universities
 Abu Dhabi University
 Al Ghurair University
 American University in the Emirates
 Amity University
 Birla Institute of Technology and Science, Pilani – Dubai Campus
 University of Birmingham
 British University in Dubai
 Curtin University Dubai
 De Montfort University, Dubai
 École Hôtelière Helvétique
 Emirates Aviation University
 Emirates Institute for Banking and Financial Studies
 French Fashion Institute ESMOD Dubai
 Hamdan Bin Mohammed Smart University
 Heriot-Watt University Dubai
 Institute of Management Technology, Dubai
 Islamic Azad University
 Manipal University Dubai
 Middlesex University Dubai
 National Institute for Vocational Education Dubai
 St. Joseph University Dubai
 S P Jain School of Global Management Dubai
 Shaheed Zulfikar Ali Bhutto Institute of Science and Technology
 Strathclyde Business School
 University of Dubai
 University of Exeter 
 University of Wollongong in Dubai
 Zayed University

Education campuses 
Dubai Knowledge Park provides facilities for corporate training and learning institutions to operate with 100% foreign ownership. There are over 400 companies and institutions operating within it, which include occupational assessment and testing providers, universities, computer training providers, professional centers, executive development providers and HR consultancy companies. It is owned by Dubai Holding's subsidiary TECOM Investments. It is located in Al Sufouh 2 District.

In 2007, TECOM Investments launched a separate facility, Dubai International Academic City, where all institutions of higher education from Dubai Knowledge Park will be moved to.

Dubai Knowledge Park has previously been known as Knowledge Village.

Institutions expected to move to DIAC
 Dubai Aviation College (currently near Garhood Bridge)
 Dubai Police Officers' Academy (currently between Burj Al Arab and Sheikh Zayed Road)
 St Petersburg State University of Engineering and Economics
 UAE Academy of Hospitality

References

External links

Archive.gulfnews.com
Dubaifaqs.com 

 
Dubai International Academic City
2006 establishments in the United Arab Emirates
Education in Dubai
Academic enclaves
Free-trade zones of the United Arab Emirates